was a Japanese linguist.

Biography
Born in Kure, Hiroshima, he received his education in Tokyo. He graduated from the Tokyo Imperial University, now University of Tokyo in 1931. He specialized in Historical Japanese phonology and Historical Chinese phonology, making important contribution to the studies of Jōdai Tokushu Kanazukai and Middle Chinese.

External links
Works on-line

Linguists from Japan
1908 births
1952 deaths
People from Kure, Hiroshima
University of Tokyo alumni
20th-century linguists
Linguists of Japanese